Packfleet is a fully electric UK-based parcel courier, primarily operating in London and within the M25. Packfleet was founded in 2021 by three former Monzo employees and has raised £9m of investment from Tom Blomfield, General Catalyst, Entree Capital and Creandum, among others. 

Packfleet looks to compete with traditional parcel couriers like DPD and Evri by offering an all-electric delivery service built on a new technology platform.  They also directly employ their drivers rather than relying on the gig economy. Packfleet now operates over 50 electric vans for deliveries and works with over 130 retailers. They plan to expand outside London in 2023 according to the CEO.

References

British companies established in 2021
Logistics companies of the United Kingdom
Technology companies based in London